Meerapur Assembly constituency is one of the 403 constituencies of the Uttar Pradesh Legislative Assembly, India. It is a part of the Muzaffarnagar district and one of the five assembly constituencies in the Bijnor Lok Sabha constituency. First election in this assembly constituency was held in 2012 after the "Delimitation of Parliamentary and Assembly Constituencies Order, 2008" was passed and the constituency came into existence in the year 2008.

Wards / areas
Extent of Meerapur Assembly constituency is KCs Meerapur, Bhopa, PCs Salarpur, Jatwara, Kawal, Dhansari, Jolly, Kheri Ferozabad, Roorkali Talabali, Nagla Bujurg, Kamheda, Tissa, Kakrauli, Tewda of Jansath KC, Meerapur NP & Bhokerheri NP of Jansath Tehsil.

Members of the Legislative Assembly

Election results

2022

2017

Source:

See also

Government of Uttar Pradesh
Bijnor Lok Sabha constituency
List of Vidhan Sabha constituencies of Uttar Pradesh
Muzaffarnagar district
Sixteenth Legislative Assembly of Uttar Pradesh
Uttar Pradesh Legislative Assembly
Uttar Pradesh

References

External links
 

Assembly constituencies of Uttar Pradesh
Politics of Muzaffarnagar district
Constituencies established in 2008
2008 establishments in Uttar Pradesh